Alfaro is an electoral urban parish or district of Quito, Ecuador. The parish was established as a result of the October 2004 political elections, when the city was divided into 19 electoral urban parishes.

References

Parishes of Quito Canton